Theresa Lynn Russell ( Paup; born March 20, 1957) is an American actress whose career spans over four decades. Her filmography includes over fifty feature films, ranging from mainstream to independent and experimental films.

Born in San Diego, Russell was raised in the Los Angeles suburb of Burbank, where she had a turbulent upbringing marked by poverty, and dropped out of high school at age 16. Russell subsequently began modeling, which brought her to the attention of film producer Sam Spiegel. Through Spiegel, she was cast in Elia Kazan's The Last Tycoon (1976), playing the daughter of a prominent film executive.

In 1978, Russell starred opposite Dustin Hoffman in the critically-acclaimed crime drama Straight Time. Her next role was a lead in English filmmaker Nicolas Roeg's controversial thriller Bad Timing (1980), which earned critical praise. Russell and Roeg began a romance while shooting the film, and it marked one of six projects they would collaborate on following their 1982 marriage. She next appeared in Roeg's drama Eureka (1983), followed by the John Byrum-directed The Razor's Edge (1984). Russell portrayed Marilyn Monroe in Roeg's experimental alternate history film Insignificance (1985), followed by a lead role as a serial killer in Bob Rafelson's neo-noir film Black Widow (1987), which garnered her significant commercial attention.

Russell continued to collaborate with Roeg throughout the late 1980s and early 1990s, appearing in a Roeg-directed segment of the anthology film Aria (1987), as well as the features Track 29 (1989) and Cold Heaven (1991). Other roles from this time included the crime dramas Physical Evidence (1989) and Impulse (1990).

In 1991, Russell starred as a prostitute in Ken Russell's satirical drama Whore, followed by Steven Soderbergh's experimental black-and-white feature, Kafka, co-starring Jeremy Irons. After appearing in a number of independent films in the mid-1990s, Russell had a supporting role in the commercially successful neo-noir Wild Things (1998), and the critically-acclaimed drama The Believer (2001). In 2005, she had a supporting role on the HBO miniseries Empire Falls, followed by a minor part in Sam Raimi's Spider-Man 3 (2007).

The song "Athena" by the rock group The Who, was written about a 1979 chance meeting with Pete Townshend, who was smitten and rejected by her. The single appears on the band's 1982 album, It's Hard.

Biography

Early life
Russell was born in San Diego, California, the eldest of three children to teenage mother Carole Platt (née Mall) and Jerry Russell Paup. When she was five years old, Russell's parents divorced, and her father relocated to Mexico. Her mother subsequently remarried, and moved the family to Los Angeles County, where Russell was raised primarily in Burbank. Through her mother's marriage to her stepfather, she has two half-siblings. Russell has said she grew up in poverty, and that at times her family required food stamps to survive. She had a turbulent relationship with her stepfather, whom she described as "hideous", "incapable" and "an asshole," and by age thirteen, she had begun experimenting with recreational drugs. Despite her early struggles, Russell commented in 1991: "I hate it when actors talk about what a hard time they had as kids. That was just my life. It wasn't horrible. When you're free, white, and over 21, how hard can it be? Get over it."

At age fourteen, while a student at Burbank High School, Russell was approached while walking on a street in Los Angeles by a photographer who suggested she model. Suspecting the photographer merely wanted to exploit her, Russell requested that he meet her mother first, to which he obliged. She subsequently began modeling for a fashion photographer who was a friend of her mother. "I ended up having what I realise now was a long, almost like a Lolita/Humbert Humbert relationship with him—without the sex. He was madly in love with me and took pictures of me a lot. He would come round and we would go off and shoot pictures up in the mountains."

Russell dropped out of high school at 16 and moved in with a 28-year-old boyfriend who worked as a primal scream therapist, whom she later described as "one of the most fucked-up people I have ever met." She enrolled at the Lee Strasberg Institute in West Hollywood to study acting at age 17.

1976–1980: Career beginnings

Through her modeling work, Russell met photographer Peter Douglas, son of Kirk Douglas, who introduced her to film producer Sam Spiegel in 1975. At the time, Spiegel was beginning production of a film adaptation of F. Scott Fitzgerald's The Last Tycoon, directed by Elia Kazan and adapted for the screen by Harold Pinter. Spiegel suggested that Russell audition for the role of Cecilia Brady, the daughter of a studio executive (played by Robert Mitchum), a part in which she was ultimately cast.

In a retrospective interview, Russell commented on the experience with ambivalence, saying: "Sam [Spiegel] loved to be seen with child-girls on his arm. I was 16 years old and still living at home, and he took me to the Bistro and tried to stick his tongue down my throat. He thought he could buy and sell people." Kazan corroborated this, recalling: "Sam suggested her. I had strong reservations, saw some values but more drawbacks. It was obvious to me, and later conversations with Theresa verified this, that Sam had, for a long time, tried to gentle her into his bed." According to Russell, prior to shooting the film, Spiegel attempted to have her sign a contract placing her under his control for a nine-year period. "I was not a bimbo," she recalled. "I called a lawyer. Sam was furious. He said he would see to it that I got no billing in the movie. And to this day, if you ever see any advertising for The Last Tycoon, my name is in teensy-weensy type. I was completely left out of the publicity for the movie. He was unrelenting. I asked him, 'If I sign your contract, what if I want to do some role in some other picture?' He said, 'You'll have to come to my boat in the South of France.' Yeah, and what happens then?"

The following year, after completing The Last Tycoon, Russell was cast as a troubled young woman who becomes associated with a criminal (played by Dustin Hoffman) in the drama Straight Time. Vincent Canby of The New York Times praised Russell in his review of the film, writing: "Miss Russell, who was so good in The Last Tycoon, is an extremely appealing actress, with a kind of contemporary authority, but she looks so classy, so understated-chic, that she suggests an upper-class girl whose path would cross Max's only at the beach, or maybe at a singles bar." In 1979, Russell starred in the miniseries Blind Ambition for CBS, a biographical drama focusing on the Watergate scandal, in which she portrayed Maureen Dean, the wife of White House Counsel John Dean (played by Martin Sheen).

Russell was subsequently cast as Milena Flaherty, a young American living in Vienna who enters a dysfunctional relationship with a psychoanalyst (played by Art Garfunkel) in Bad Timing (1980). It marked the first of six films Russell would go on to star in directed by English filmmaker Nicolas Roeg, whom she began a relationship with after completing filming. Bad Timing was subject to controversy upon release due to its graphic depiction of sexuality and rape, though Russell's performance was praised by critic Roger Ebert, who wrote: "If there is any reason to see this film, however, it is the performance by Theresa Russell (who was Dustin Hoffman's lover in Straight Time). She is only 22 or 23, and yet her performance is astonishingly powerful. She will be in better films, I hope, and is the only participant who need not be ashamed of this one."

1981–1986: Collaborations with Nicolas Roeg

Russell became a muse of Roeg's, and the two were married in February 1982 in Westminster, London. The couple had two sons over the next several years, Statten (born 1983) and Maximillian (born 1985), and resided primarily in Notting Hill, though Russell also maintained a residence in Los Angeles. Following her role in Roeg's Bad Timing, Russell performed the English audio dubbing of Daria Nicolodi's character in the giallo film Tenebre (1982), directed by Dario Argento. Her next on-screen role was in Nicolas Roeg's drama Eureka (1983), portraying the daughter of a Klondike prospector, played by Gene Hackman. 
  
The following year, Russell appeared in John Byrum's The Razor's Edge, an adaptation of the W. Somerset Maugham novel of the same name, in which she co-starred with Bill Murray. The film was a financial failure, grossing under $2 million against its $13 million budget.

She then portrayed Marilyn Monroe in Roeg's experimental alternate history film Insignificance (1985), based on the play by Terry Johnson, in which she appeared opposite Gary Busey and Tony Curtis. In retrospect, Russell described the role as "really challenging because at first I did not want to do it. That was a pile of horseshit I didn’t want to step in. Everybody had these preconceived ideas, and I didn’t want [to do] a caricature. That was kind of tricky to get my head around." Critic Roger Ebert praised her performance in the film, writing: "She doesn't really look very much like Monroe, but what does it matter? The blond hair and the red lips are there, and so is the manner, which has been imitated so often, and so badly, that the imitators prove that Monroe was a special case. Russell doesn't imitate. She builds her performance from the ground up, and it works to hold the movie together."

She is the subject of a photocollage by David Hockney entitled Nude 17th June 1984 #10.

1987–1998: Mainstream recognition
In 1987, Russell gained mainstream exposure for her portrayal of Catharine Peterson, a serial killer who seduces and murders wealthy men in Bob Rafelson's  noir thriller Black Widow, co-starring Debra Winger. Russell's performance earned praise; Vincent Canby of The New York Times wrote that Russell's "clear-eyed sweetness... adds unexpected dimension to the homicidal Catharine." The same year, she appeared in a Nicolas Roeg-directed segment (a film version of the opera Un ballo in maschera) of the anthology film Aria. The following year, she appeared in Roeg's Track 29 (1988), playing a young Southern woman who meets a mysterious British drifter, played by Gary Oldman. Roger Ebert, commenting on her performance, wrote: "Russell, who has survived the convoluted terrain of many of Roeg’s movies (he is her husband), seems at home in this twisted landscape, and [she and Oldman] work their characters up into an orgy of mutual laceration."

Next, Russell portrayed a public defender in the crime drama Physical Evidence (1988), starring Burt Reynolds and directed by Michael Crichton. The film received largely unfavorable reviews from critics, with some, such as Rita Kempley of The Washington Post, singling out Russell's acting as a primary fault. Roger Ebert, who had previously championed many of Russell's performances, suggested in his review of the film that she and Reynolds merely lacked chemistry.

In 1990, Russell was cast in Sondra Locke's Impulse, in which she portrayed a police officer who is drawn into the world of prostitution while posing undercover as a prostitute in Los Angeles. The following year, Russell again played a prostitute in Ken Russell's satirical drama Whore (1991), based on the play by David Hines. Though the film received a mixed reception from critics, Russell's performance was praised by The New York Times and Roger Ebert of the Chicago Sun-Times. The same year, she was cast in a lead role opposite Jeremy Irons in Steven Soderbergh's Kafka (1991), a black-and-white surrealist adaptation of several Franz Kafka stories. David Ansen of Newsweek felt that Russell was miscast in her role. She again united with her husband Roeg for his film Cold Heaven (also 1991), starring opposite Mark Harmon as a woman whose husband inexplicably rises from the dead.

Russell was the narrator of the British drama Being Human (1994), starring Robin Williams, followed by the British comedy The Grotesque (1995), opposite Alan Bates and Sting.

Russell was then cast in the neo-noir thriller Wild Things (1998), playing the mother of Denise Richards's character. The film was a box office success and went on to establish a cult following.

1999–2014: Later film and television

After appearing in the crime drama Luckytown (2000) opposite James Caan and Kirsten Dunst, Russell was then cast in The Believer (2001), a drama written and directed by Henry Bean, and starring Ryan Gosling as a Jewish man who becomes a neo-Nazi. The film was critically acclaimed and received the Special Jury Prize—Drama at the 2001 Sundance Film Festival.

In the early 2000s, Russell mainly appeared in low-budget and independent films, such as The House Next Door (2002), Now & Forever (2002), and The Box (2003).
In 2005, she was cast in the role of Charlene in the HBO mini-series Empire Falls, opposite Ed Harris. She also appeared in the supporting role of Emma Marko in Spider-Man 3 as the wife of Flint Marko (Thomas Haden Church). Spider-Man 3 was a major box office success, grossing nearly $900 million worldwide. The following year, she appeared in the independent drama Jolene, starring Jessica Chastain, and also had a minor role playing the mother of Scarlett Johansson's character in the romantic comedy He's Just Not That into You (2009), though her scenes were eventually cut from the film.

In 2012, she appeared in the Lifetime television film Liz & Dick, playing Sara Taylor, the mother of Elizabeth Taylor (portrayed by Lindsay Lohan). The following year, she had a guest role on the miniseries Delete.

Filmography

References

Sources

External links

 
 

1957 births
Living people
20th-century American actresses
21st-century American actresses
Actresses from Burbank, California
Actresses from Los Angeles
Actresses from San Diego
American female models
American film actresses
American telenovela actresses
American television actresses
American voice actresses
Lee Strasberg Theatre and Film Institute alumni